Jonathan Carril Regueiro (born 28 February 1984) is a Spanish professional footballer who plays as a centre forward.

Football career

Early years / Austria
Carril was born in Boqueixón, A Coruña, Galicia. After years of playing only for amateur clubs or reserve squads (Deportivo de La Coruña B, Atlético Madrid B, Levante UD B, Racing de Ferrol, CD Linares, UD Villa de Santa Brígida and Santa Eulàlia), he moved in summer 2009 to Austria, joining SV Ried in the Bundesliga.

On 13 March 2010, Carril scored his first goal in the Austrian top flight, in a 3–0 home win against SV Mattersburg for the season's 27th round. In June, he switched to another team in the country, SV Grödig.

Hong Kong
On 29 May 2012, Kitchee SC general manager Ken Ng announced that Carril would be joining the club, and the transfer was confirmed three days later. He made an impressive debut, netting twice in a 3–0 win over Sun Hei SC; however, the signing of compatriot Pablo Couñago saw him loaned out to Southern District RSA for the rest of the season due to foreign player restriction quotas, and he also scored in his maiden appearance, against Sun Pegasus FC in a 3–3 draw.

On 19 May 2013, Carril joined Southern District on a permanent contract.

Personal life
Carril's younger brother, Iván, was also a footballer. Both had a very brief youth spell at FC Barcelona, before finishing their footballing formation at local Deportivo de La Coruña.

Club statistics

References

External links

1984 births
Living people
People from Santiago (comarca)
Sportspeople from the Province of A Coruña
Spanish footballers
Footballers from Galicia (Spain)
Association football forwards
Segunda División B players
Tercera División players
Deportivo Fabril players
Atlético Madrid B players
Atlético Levante UD players
Racing de Ferrol footballers
CF Palencia footballers
Austrian Football Bundesliga players
SV Ried players
SV Grödig players
Hong Kong First Division League players
Kitchee SC players
Southern District FC players
Spanish expatriate footballers
Expatriate footballers in Austria
Expatriate footballers in Hong Kong
Spanish expatriate sportspeople in Austria
Spanish expatriate sportspeople in Hong Kong